This is a partial list of unnumbered minor planets for principal provisional designations assigned during 1–15 February 2004. , a total of 259 bodies remain unnumbered for this period. Objects for this year are listed on the following pages: A–B · C · D–E · F · G–H · J–O · P–Q · Ri · Rii · Riii · S · Ti · Tii · Tiii · Tiv · U–V · W–X and Y. Also see previous and next year.

C 

|- id="2004 CC" bgcolor=#FFC2E0
| 7 || 2004 CC || APO || 23.6 || data-sort-value="0.068" | 68 m || single || 5 days || 07 Feb 2004 || 21 || align=left | Disc.: LINEAR || 
|- id="2004 CQ" bgcolor=#FFC2E0
| 6 || 2004 CQ || AMO || 24.7 || data-sort-value="0.041" | 41 m || single || 16 days || 26 Feb 2004 || 75 || align=left | Disc.: CSS || 
|- id="2004 CS" bgcolor=#FFC2E0
| 1 || 2004 CS || AMO || 20.2 || data-sort-value="0.32" | 320 m || multiple || 2004–2008 || 20 Dec 2008 || 92 || align=left | Disc.: LINEAR || 
|- id="2004 CY" bgcolor=#E9E9E9
| 0 || 2004 CY || MBA-M || 17.16 || 1.1 km || multiple || 2004–2021 || 15 Apr 2021 || 70 || align=left | Disc.: NEAT || 
|- id="2004 CZ1" bgcolor=#FFC2E0
| 7 ||  || APO || 24.4 || data-sort-value="0.047" | 47 m || single || 12 days || 24 Feb 2004 || 110 || align=left | Disc.: Spacewatch || 
|- id="2004 CA2" bgcolor=#FFC2E0
| 8 ||  || APO || 23.7 || data-sort-value="0.065" | 65 m || single || 10 days || 22 Feb 2004 || 44 || align=left | Disc.: NEAT || 
|- id="2004 CR2" bgcolor=#FFC2E0
| 1 ||  || AMO || 19.1 || data-sort-value="0.54" | 540 m || multiple || 2004–2012 || 25 Aug 2012 || 159 || align=left | Disc.: LPL/Spacewatch II || 
|- id="2004 CJ5" bgcolor=#E9E9E9
| 0 ||  || MBA-M || 17.0 || 1.7 km || multiple || 2004–2020 || 19 Dec 2020 || 143 || align=left | Disc.: NEATAlt.: 2015 TM49 || 
|- id="2004 CO6" bgcolor=#fefefe
| 0 ||  || MBA-I || 17.48 || data-sort-value="0.95" | 950 m || multiple || 2004–2021 || 13 May 2021 || 256 || align=left | Disc.: NEAT || 
|- id="2004 CY6" bgcolor=#fefefe
| 1 ||  || MBA-I || 19.14 || data-sort-value="0.44" | 440 m || multiple || 2004–2021 || 10 Sep 2021 || 27 || align=left | Disc.: Spacewatch || 
|- id="2004 CC8" bgcolor=#fefefe
| 0 ||  || MBA-I || 17.7 || data-sort-value="0.86" | 860 m || multiple || 2004–2021 || 18 Jan 2021 || 100 || align=left | Disc.: Tenagra II Obs.Alt.: 2009 RF40 || 
|- id="2004 CM8" bgcolor=#d6d6d6
| 0 ||  || MBA-O || 17.29 || 1.9 km || multiple || 2004–2021 || 30 Apr 2021 || 68 || align=left | Disc.: SpacewatchAlt.: 2015 BN174 || 
|- id="2004 CS8" bgcolor=#d6d6d6
| 0 ||  || MBA-O || 16.2 || 3.2 km || multiple || 2004–2021 || 18 Jan 2021 || 77 || align=left | Disc.: SpacewatchAlt.: 2013 SO58 || 
|- id="2004 CV8" bgcolor=#fefefe
| 0 ||  || HUN || 18.75 || data-sort-value="0.53" | 530 m || multiple || 2004–2022 || 22 Jan 2022 || 69 || align=left | Disc.: Spacewatch || 
|- id="2004 CW8" bgcolor=#fefefe
| 0 ||  || MBA-I || 18.3 || data-sort-value="0.65" | 650 m || multiple || 2004–2020 || 23 May 2020 || 66 || align=left | Disc.: Spacewatch || 
|- id="2004 CL9" bgcolor=#fefefe
| 0 ||  || MBA-I || 18.5 || data-sort-value="0.59" | 590 m || multiple || 2004–2020 || 17 Nov 2020 || 51 || align=left | Disc.: SpacewatchAlt.: 2011 BU87 || 
|- id="2004 CM9" bgcolor=#d6d6d6
| 1 ||  || MBA-O || 17.4 || 1.8 km || multiple || 2004–2020 || 14 Jun 2020 || 47 || align=left | Disc.: SpacewatchAlt.: 2014 AR || 
|- id="2004 CZ9" bgcolor=#E9E9E9
| 0 ||  || MBA-M || 17.72 || 1.2 km || multiple || 2004–2022 || 26 Jan 2022 || 86 || align=left | Disc.: SpacewatchAlt.: 2011 US367 || 
|- id="2004 CA10" bgcolor=#E9E9E9
| 0 ||  || MBA-M || 18.38 || data-sort-value="0.63" | 630 m || multiple || 2004–2021 || 03 Apr 2021 || 68 || align=left | Disc.: SpacewatchAlt.: 2008 AZ86, 2015 WM || 
|- id="2004 CL10" bgcolor=#E9E9E9
| 1 ||  || MBA-M || 18.14 || data-sort-value="0.70" | 700 m || multiple || 2004–2021 || 08 Jun 2021 || 51 || align=left | Disc.: Spacewatch || 
|- id="2004 CO11" bgcolor=#fefefe
| 0 ||  || MBA-I || 18.1 || data-sort-value="0.71" | 710 m || multiple || 2004–2020 || 20 Oct 2020 || 84 || align=left | Disc.: NEATAlt.: 2015 FE160 || 
|- id="2004 CY14" bgcolor=#fefefe
| 1 ||  || MBA-I || 18.8 || data-sort-value="0.52" | 520 m || multiple || 2004–2020 || 17 Nov 2020 || 57 || align=left | Disc.: SpacewatchAlt.: 2011 BP124 || 
|- id="2004 CM15" bgcolor=#d6d6d6
| 0 ||  || MBA-O || 16.5 || 2.8 km || multiple || 2004–2020 || 21 Apr 2020 || 108 || align=left | Disc.: LPL/Spacewatch II || 
|- id="2004 CO15" bgcolor=#E9E9E9
| 0 ||  || MBA-M || 17.9 || 1.1 km || multiple || 2004–2019 || 04 Nov 2019 || 50 || align=left | Disc.: LPL/Spacewatch IIAdded on 22 July 2020Alt.: 2015 XT34 || 
|- id="2004 CG16" bgcolor=#d6d6d6
| 0 ||  || MBA-O || 16.4 || 2.9 km || multiple || 2004–2021 || 18 Jan 2021 || 83 || align=left | Disc.: LPL/Spacewatch IIAlt.: 2013 TH56, 2015 BA84 || 
|- id="2004 CJ16" bgcolor=#E9E9E9
| 0 ||  || MBA-M || 17.5 || 1.3 km || multiple || 2004–2020 || 19 Dec 2020 || 47 || align=left | Disc.: LPL/Spacewatch II || 
|- id="2004 CC17" bgcolor=#E9E9E9
| 0 ||  || MBA-M || 17.68 || 1.6 km || multiple || 2004–2022 || 25 Jan 2022 || 71 || align=left | Disc.: LPL/Spacewatch II || 
|- id="2004 CK17" bgcolor=#FA8072
| 0 ||  || HUN || 18.0 || data-sort-value="0.75" | 750 m || multiple || 2004–2020 || 20 Feb 2020 || 146 || align=left | Disc.: SpacewatchAlt.: 2012 BQ71 || 
|- id="2004 CD19" bgcolor=#E9E9E9
| 0 ||  || MBA-M || 17.3 || 1.5 km || multiple || 2004–2019 || 05 Oct 2019 || 61 || align=left | Disc.: SpacewatchAlt.: 2017 DU110 || 
|- id="2004 CQ19" bgcolor=#d6d6d6
| 0 ||  || MBA-O || 15.7 || 4.0 km || multiple || 2001–2021 || 19 Jan 2021 || 125 || align=left | Disc.: SpacewatchAlt.: 2004 CW20, 2010 KP30 || 
|- id="2004 CX19" bgcolor=#d6d6d6
| 0 ||  || MBA-O || 15.8 || 3.9 km || multiple || 1996–2021 || 18 Jan 2021 || 40 || align=left | Disc.: Spacewatch || 
|- id="2004 CE20" bgcolor=#d6d6d6
| 0 ||  || MBA-O || 17.1 || 2.1 km || multiple || 2004–2021 || 11 Feb 2021 || 34 || align=left | Disc.: SpacewatchAlt.: 2015 AK62 || 
|- id="2004 CK20" bgcolor=#fefefe
| 2 ||  || MBA-I || 18.9 || data-sort-value="0.49" | 490 m || multiple || 2004–2020 || 05 Nov 2020 || 49 || align=left | Disc.: SpacewatchAlt.: 2011 BG31, 2013 TE121 || 
|- id="2004 CR20" bgcolor=#E9E9E9
| 0 ||  || MBA-M || 18.00 || 1.4 km || multiple || 2004–2022 || 22 Jan 2022 || 82 || align=left | Disc.: SpacewatchAlt.: 2012 YG6 || 
|- id="2004 CZ20" bgcolor=#E9E9E9
| 0 ||  || MBA-M || 17.93 || data-sort-value="0.77" | 770 m || multiple || 2000–2021 || 12 May 2021 || 51 || align=left | Disc.: SpacewatchAdded on 11 May 2021Alt.: 2021 FD8 || 
|- id="2004 CC23" bgcolor=#E9E9E9
| 2 ||  || MBA-M || 18.5 || data-sort-value="0.84" | 840 m || multiple || 2004–2021 || 11 Mar 2021 || 37 || align=left | Disc.: SpacewatchAdded on 9 March 2021 || 
|- id="2004 CJ23" bgcolor=#fefefe
| 0 ||  || MBA-I || 18.3 || data-sort-value="0.65" | 650 m || multiple || 2004–2020 || 19 May 2020 || 61 || align=left | Disc.: Spacewatch || 
|- id="2004 CP23" bgcolor=#E9E9E9
| 0 ||  || MBA-M || 17.94 || data-sort-value="0.77" | 770 m || multiple || 2004–2021 || 08 Apr 2021 || 79 || align=left | Disc.: Spacewatch || 
|- id="2004 CC24" bgcolor=#E9E9E9
| 0 ||  || MBA-M || 17.1 || 1.6 km || multiple || 2004–2021 || 18 Jan 2021 || 149 || align=left | Disc.: Spacewatch || 
|- id="2004 CM24" bgcolor=#fefefe
| 3 ||  || MBA-I || 18.7 || data-sort-value="0.54" | 540 m || multiple || 2004–2020 || 16 Dec 2020 || 39 || align=left | Disc.: SpacewatchAlt.: 2011 CW102 || 
|- id="2004 CT25" bgcolor=#E9E9E9
| 0 ||  || MBA-M || 16.90 || 1.2 km || multiple || 2004–2021 || 16 May 2021 || 63 || align=left | Disc.: Spacewatch || 
|- id="2004 CN26" bgcolor=#fefefe
| 0 ||  || MBA-I || 18.41 || data-sort-value="0.62" | 620 m || multiple || 2004–2021 || 15 Apr 2021 || 106 || align=left | Disc.: LPL/Spacewatch IIAlt.: 2006 YE10 || 
|- id="2004 CW27" bgcolor=#E9E9E9
| 0 ||  || MBA-M || 18.34 || data-sort-value="0.64" | 640 m || multiple || 2004–2021 || 09 Apr 2021 || 45 || align=left | Disc.: Spacewatch || 
|- id="2004 CD29" bgcolor=#d6d6d6
| 0 ||  || MBA-O || 17.51 || 1.8 km || multiple || 2004–2021 || 03 May 2021 || 75 || align=left | Disc.: SpacewatchAlt.: 2015 FR261 || 
|- id="2004 CN29" bgcolor=#d6d6d6
| 0 ||  || MBA-O || 16.8 || 2.4 km || multiple || 2004–2020 || 17 Apr 2020 || 62 || align=left | Disc.: SpacewatchAlt.: 2008 YS69 || 
|- id="2004 CV29" bgcolor=#E9E9E9
| 0 ||  || MBA-M || 17.21 || 2.0 km || multiple || 2004–2021 || 30 Nov 2021 || 130 || align=left | Disc.: Spacewatch || 
|- id="2004 CR30" bgcolor=#E9E9E9
| 0 ||  || MBA-M || 18.40 || data-sort-value="0.88" | 880 m || multiple || 2004–2021 || 08 Apr 2021 || 62 || align=left | Disc.: Spacewatch || 
|- id="2004 CY30" bgcolor=#E9E9E9
| 0 ||  || MBA-M || 18.14 || data-sort-value="0.70" | 700 m || multiple || 1994–2021 || 09 Apr 2021 || 80 || align=left | Disc.: Spacewatch || 
|- id="2004 CP31" bgcolor=#E9E9E9
| 1 ||  || MBA-M || 18.1 || 1.0 km || multiple || 1994–2017 || 21 Feb 2017 || 27 || align=left | Disc.: Spacewatch || 
|- id="2004 CT31" bgcolor=#fefefe
| 0 ||  || MBA-I || 18.2 || data-sort-value="0.68" | 680 m || multiple || 2004–2021 || 10 Aug 2021 || 97 || align=left | Disc.: SpacewatchAlt.: 2008 CB48 || 
|- id="2004 CZ31" bgcolor=#d6d6d6
| 0 ||  || MBA-O || 16.4 || 2.9 km || multiple || 2004–2020 || 24 Mar 2020 || 111 || align=left | Disc.: SpacewatchAlt.: 2015 DM179 || 
|- id="2004 CV32" bgcolor=#d6d6d6
| 4 ||  || MBA-O || 17.8 || 1.5 km || multiple || 2004–2008 || 30 Nov 2008 || 13 || align=left | Disc.: LPL/Spacewatch II || 
|- id="2004 CB33" bgcolor=#fefefe
| 0 ||  || MBA-I || 18.0 || data-sort-value="0.75" | 750 m || multiple || 2004–2020 || 11 Dec 2020 || 99 || align=left | Disc.: LPL/Spacewatch IIAlt.: 2015 FB293 || 
|- id="2004 CD33" bgcolor=#E9E9E9
| 0 ||  || MBA-M || 17.7 || 1.2 km || multiple || 2004–2021 || 07 Jan 2021 || 74 || align=left | Disc.: LPL/Spacewatch IIAlt.: 2011 UM68, 2017 DG63 || 
|- id="2004 CG33" bgcolor=#E9E9E9
| 0 ||  || MBA-M || 18.29 || data-sort-value="0.92" | 920 m || multiple || 2004–2021 || 07 Feb 2021 || 58 || align=left | Disc.: LPL/Spacewatch II || 
|- id="2004 CN33" bgcolor=#E9E9E9
| 2 ||  || MBA-M || 18.6 || data-sort-value="0.57" | 570 m || multiple || 2004–2019 || 28 Nov 2019 || 40 || align=left | Disc.: SpacewatchAdded on 22 July 2020 || 
|- id="2004 CC34" bgcolor=#fefefe
| 0 ||  || MBA-I || 17.6 || data-sort-value="0.90" | 900 m || multiple || 2004–2021 || 17 Jan 2021 || 161 || align=left | Disc.: LPL/Spacewatch II || 
|- id="2004 CH34" bgcolor=#E9E9E9
| 0 ||  || MBA-M || 18.27 || data-sort-value="0.66" | 660 m || multiple || 2000–2021 || 11 May 2021 || 76 || align=left | Disc.: SpacewatchAdded on 11 May 2021Alt.: 2015 TX173 || 
|- id="2004 CD38" bgcolor=#E9E9E9
| 0 ||  || MBA-M || 16.46 || 2.1 km || multiple || 2004–2021 || 06 Apr 2021 || 327 || align=left | Disc.: NEATAlt.: 2014 OL373 || 
|- id="2004 CD39" bgcolor=#FFC2E0
| 1 ||  || AMO || 20.4 || data-sort-value="0.30" | 300 m || multiple || 2004–2008 || 11 May 2008 || 135 || align=left | Disc.: NEAT || 
|- id="2004 CE39" bgcolor=#FFC2E0
| 3 ||  || APO || 21.4 || data-sort-value="0.19" | 190 m || multiple || 2004–2005 || 19 Jan 2005 || 135 || align=left | Disc.: LONEOS || 
|- id="2004 CJ39" bgcolor=#C7FF8F
| 1 ||  || CEN || 13.6 || 11 km || multiple || 2004–2007 || 21 Apr 2007 || 17 || align=left | Disc.: Spacewatch || 
|- id="2004 CP42" bgcolor=#fefefe
| 0 ||  || HUN || 19.48 || data-sort-value="0.38" | 380 m || multiple || 2004–2021 || 13 Sep 2021 || 50 || align=left | Disc.: LPL/Spacewatch IIAdded on 22 July 2020 || 
|- id="2004 CZ43" bgcolor=#E9E9E9
| 4 ||  || MBA-M || 17.7 || 1.6 km || multiple || 2004–2013 || 16 Feb 2013 || 26 || align=left | Disc.: SpacewatchAlt.: 2013 CR14 || 
|- id="2004 CD44" bgcolor=#fefefe
| 0 ||  || MBA-I || 18.3 || data-sort-value="0.65" | 650 m || multiple || 2004–2020 || 23 May 2020 || 60 || align=left | Disc.: Spacewatch || 
|- id="2004 CC46" bgcolor=#E9E9E9
| 1 ||  || MBA-M || 18.72 || data-sort-value="0.54" | 540 m || multiple || 2004–2021 || 31 May 2021 || 33 || align=left | Disc.: SpacewatchAdded on 17 June 2021 || 
|- id="2004 CQ47" bgcolor=#E9E9E9
| 0 ||  || MBA-M || 17.4 || data-sort-value="0.98" | 980 m || multiple || 2004–2021 || 07 Jun 2021 || 163 || align=left | Disc.: AMOSAlt.: 2015 XX78 || 
|- id="2004 CO49" bgcolor=#FFC2E0
| 1 ||  || APO || 21.6 || data-sort-value="0.17" | 170 m || multiple || 2004–2017 || 27 Mar 2017 || 84 || align=left | Disc.: LINEARPotentially hazardous object || 
|- id="2004 CP49" bgcolor=#FFC2E0
| 0 ||  || AMO || 19.34 || data-sort-value="0.48" | 480 m || multiple || 2004–2021 || 03 Sep 2021 || 131 || align=left | Disc.: AMOS || 
|- id="2004 CQ49" bgcolor=#FA8072
| 4 ||  || MCA || 18.8 || data-sort-value="0.97" | 970 m || single || 98 days || 28 Mar 2004 || 39 || align=left | Disc.: NEAT || 
|- id="2004 CV49" bgcolor=#fefefe
| 0 ||  || MBA-I || 17.25 || 1.1 km || multiple || 2004–2021 || 01 Oct 2021 || 160 || align=left | Disc.: CSSAlt.: 2017 BF60 || 
|- id="2004 CV50" bgcolor=#d6d6d6
| 1 ||  || MBA-O || 17.6 || 1.7 km || multiple || 2004–2020 || 11 Jun 2020 || 198 || align=left | Disc.: NEAT || 
|- id="2004 CR51" bgcolor=#FA8072
| 0 ||  || MCA || 18.41 || 1.2 km || multiple || 2004–2022 || 13 Jan 2022 || 125 || align=left | Disc.: NEAT || 
|- id="2004 CH52" bgcolor=#FA8072
| 0 ||  || MCA || 19.95 || data-sort-value="0.30" | 300 m || multiple || 2004–2021 || 31 Oct 2021 || 223 || align=left | Disc.: CSS || 
|- id="2004 CC53" bgcolor=#E9E9E9
| 0 ||  || MBA-M || 17.1 || 1.6 km || multiple || 1998–2021 || 18 Jan 2021 || 100 || align=left | Disc.: Spacewatch || 
|- id="2004 CM53" bgcolor=#fefefe
| 0 ||  || MBA-I || 18.2 || data-sort-value="0.68" | 680 m || multiple || 2004–2020 || 22 Jun 2020 || 67 || align=left | Disc.: NEAT || 
|- id="2004 CC55" bgcolor=#d6d6d6
| 0 ||  || MBA-O || 16.9 || 2.3 km || multiple || 2004–2020 || 25 Feb 2020 || 59 || align=left | Disc.: LPL/Spacewatch IIAlt.: 2015 EE37 || 
|- id="2004 CU59" bgcolor=#d6d6d6
| 0 ||  || MBA-O || 16.1 || 3.4 km || multiple || 2004–2020 || 21 May 2020 || 230 || align=left | Disc.: NEATAlt.: 2010 JT152 || 
|- id="2004 CE60" bgcolor=#d6d6d6
| 0 ||  || MBA-O || 16.79 || 2.4 km || multiple || 2004–2021 || 09 Apr 2021 || 122 || align=left | Disc.: NEATAlt.: 2015 AM171 || 
|- id="2004 CH60" bgcolor=#E9E9E9
| 0 ||  || MBA-M || 17.3 || 1.5 km || multiple || 2004–2021 || 04 Jan 2021 || 105 || align=left | Disc.: NEAT || 
|- id="2004 CK63" bgcolor=#d6d6d6
| 0 ||  || MBA-O || 16.2 || 3.2 km || multiple || 1998–2020 || 22 May 2020 || 130 || align=left | Disc.: NEATAlt.: 2014 BO10 || 
|- id="2004 CR63" bgcolor=#FA8072
| 0 ||  || MCA || 17.58 || 1.7 km || multiple || 2004–2022 || 08 Jan 2022 || 89 || align=left | Disc.: NEAT || 
|- id="2004 CB64" bgcolor=#d6d6d6
| 0 ||  || MBA-O || 17.45 || 1.8 km || multiple || 2004–2021 || 16 Apr 2021 || 47 || align=left | Disc.: SpacewatchAdded on 22 July 2020Alt.: 2010 AJ149 || 
|- id="2004 CA69" bgcolor=#E9E9E9
| 0 ||  || MBA-M || 17.5 || 1.3 km || multiple || 2003–2020 || 24 Dec 2020 || 108 || align=left | Disc.: Spacewatch || 
|- id="2004 CU69" bgcolor=#E9E9E9
| 0 ||  || MBA-M || 17.12 || 1.6 km || multiple || 2004–2021 || 18 May 2021 || 161 || align=left | Disc.: NEATAlt.: 2005 ND33, 2015 XE51 || 
|- id="2004 CE75" bgcolor=#d6d6d6
| 0 ||  || MBA-O || 16.10 || 3.4 km || multiple || 2003–2021 || 12 May 2021 || 173 || align=left | Disc.: NEAT || 
|- id="2004 CH75" bgcolor=#d6d6d6
| 0 ||  || MBA-O || 15.91 || 3.7 km || multiple || 2004–2021 || 17 Apr 2021 || 227 || align=left | Disc.: NEATAlt.: 2013 VR6 || 
|- id="2004 CE81" bgcolor=#d6d6d6
| 0 ||  || MBA-O || 17.00 || 2.2 km || multiple || 2004–2021 || 16 Apr 2021 || 108 || align=left | Disc.: SpacewatchAlt.: 2015 BD155 || 
|- id="2004 CE82" bgcolor=#E9E9E9
| 0 ||  || MBA-M || 17.1 || 1.6 km || multiple || 2004–2021 || 19 Jan 2021 || 266 || align=left | Disc.: Spacewatch || 
|- id="2004 CF82" bgcolor=#E9E9E9
| 0 ||  || MBA-M || 17.5 || data-sort-value="0.94" | 940 m || multiple || 2004–2021 || 14 Jun 2021 || 105 || align=left | Disc.: Spacewatch || 
|- id="2004 CS86" bgcolor=#E9E9E9
| 0 ||  || MBA-M || 17.0 || 1.2 km || multiple || 2003–2021 || 07 Jun 2021 || 141 || align=left | Disc.: LINEAR || 
|- id="2004 CA87" bgcolor=#E9E9E9
| 3 ||  || MBA-M || 18.6 || data-sort-value="0.57" | 570 m || multiple || 2004–2021 || 15 Apr 2021 || 30 || align=left | Disc.: SpacewatchAlt.: 2021 EF25 || 
|- id="2004 CR87" bgcolor=#d6d6d6
| 0 ||  || MBA-O || 16.31 || 3.0 km || multiple || 1999–2021 || 14 Apr 2021 || 110 || align=left | Disc.: Spacewatch || 
|- id="2004 CH88" bgcolor=#d6d6d6
| 0 ||  || MBA-O || 17.09 || 2.1 km || multiple || 2004–2021 || 01 May 2021 || 59 || align=left | Disc.: Spacewatch || 
|- id="2004 CJ88" bgcolor=#E9E9E9
| 0 ||  || MBA-M || 17.6 || 1.3 km || multiple || 2004–2020 || 12 Dec 2020 || 72 || align=left | Disc.: SpacewatchAdded on 19 October 2020Alt.: 2013 EX1 || 
|- id="2004 CR88" bgcolor=#E9E9E9
| 1 ||  || MBA-M || 17.8 || 1.2 km || multiple || 2004–2020 || 11 Dec 2020 || 44 || align=left | Disc.: SpacewatchAdded on 9 March 2021 || 
|- id="2004 CS88" bgcolor=#d6d6d6
| 0 ||  || MBA-O || 16.9 || 2.3 km || multiple || 2004–2020 || 19 Mar 2020 || 66 || align=left | Disc.: Spacewatch || 
|- id="2004 CJ89" bgcolor=#d6d6d6
| 2 ||  || MBA-O || 17.7 || 1.6 km || multiple || 2004–2019 || 08 Apr 2019 || 29 || align=left | Disc.: Spacewatch || 
|- id="2004 CN89" bgcolor=#d6d6d6
| 0 ||  || MBA-O || 16.33 || 3.0 km || multiple || 2004–2021 || 11 Mar 2021 || 147 || align=left | Disc.: SpacewatchAlt.: 2014 YE30 || 
|- id="2004 CH90" bgcolor=#fefefe
| 0 ||  || MBA-I || 18.4 || data-sort-value="0.62" | 620 m || multiple || 2004–2021 || 04 Jan 2021 || 50 || align=left | Disc.: Spacewatch || 
|- id="2004 CQ90" bgcolor=#E9E9E9
| 2 ||  || MBA-M || 17.1 || 1.1 km || multiple || 2000–2020 || 15 Feb 2020 || 87 || align=left | Disc.: LINEARAlt.: 2000 EZ191 || 
|- id="2004 CW90" bgcolor=#E9E9E9
| 3 ||  || MBA-M || 18.12 || 1.3 km || multiple || 2004–2022 || 07 Jan 2022 || 18 || align=left | Disc.: SpacewatchAdded on 21 August 2021 || 
|- id="2004 CJ91" bgcolor=#E9E9E9
| 1 ||  || MBA-M || 17.2 || 1.5 km || multiple || 2004–2019 || 23 Sep 2019 || 54 || align=left | Disc.: Spacewatch || 
|- id="2004 CK91" bgcolor=#fefefe
| 0 ||  || HUN || 18.7 || data-sort-value="0.54" | 540 m || multiple || 2004–2020 || 17 Oct 2020 || 84 || align=left | Disc.: SpacewatchAdded on 19 October 2020 || 
|- id="2004 CT101" bgcolor=#d6d6d6
| 0 ||  || MBA-O || 16.29 || 3.1 km || multiple || 2004–2021 || 11 Jul 2021 || 167 || align=left | Disc.: NEATAlt.: 2010 BV143 || 
|- id="2004 CV101" bgcolor=#d6d6d6
| 0 ||  || MBA-O || 16.53 || 2.8 km || multiple || 2004–2021 || 13 May 2021 || 207 || align=left | Disc.: NEATAlt.: 2010 MD63 || 
|- id="2004 CM104" bgcolor=#E9E9E9
| 1 ||  || MBA-M || 16.8 || 2.4 km || multiple || 2004–2021 || 12 Jan 2021 || 93 || align=left | Disc.: NEAT || 
|- id="2004 CN106" bgcolor=#fefefe
| 0 ||  || HUN || 17.75 || data-sort-value="0.84" | 840 m || multiple || 2004–2021 || 08 Oct 2021 || 269 || align=left | Disc.: NEAT || 
|- id="2004 CX106" bgcolor=#FA8072
| 0 ||  || MCA || 17.07 || 2.1 km || multiple || 2004–2022 || 14 Jan 2022 || 201 || align=left | Disc.: NEAT || 
|- id="2004 CS107" bgcolor=#E9E9E9
| 0 ||  || MBA-M || 17.5 || 1.3 km || multiple || 2004–2021 || 07 Apr 2021 || 125 || align=left | Disc.: Spacewatch || 
|- id="2004 CY108" bgcolor=#E9E9E9
| 0 ||  || MBA-M || 16.78 || 1.9 km || multiple || 2004–2021 || 07 May 2021 || 355 || align=left | Disc.: NEATAlt.: 2011 WX150 || 
|- id="2004 CS110" bgcolor=#E9E9E9
| E ||  || MBA-M || 17.8 || 1.2 km || single || 6 days || 16 Feb 2004 || 9 || align=left | Disc.: Kitt Peak Obs. || 
|- id="2004 CT110" bgcolor=#fefefe
| 0 ||  || HUN || 18.50 || data-sort-value="0.59" | 590 m || multiple || 2004–2022 || 23 Jan 2022 || 69 || align=left | Disc.: Kitt Peak Obs.Alt.: 2015 LR32 || 
|- id="2004 CU110" bgcolor=#fefefe
| 0 ||  || MBA-I || 18.73 || data-sort-value="0.53" | 530 m || multiple || 2004–2022 || 06 Jan 2022 || 61 || align=left | Disc.: Spacewatch || 
|- id="2004 CM111" bgcolor=#C2E0FF
| – ||  || TNO || 14.2 || 8.0 km || single || 9 days || 22 Feb 2004 || 41 || align=left | Disc.: SpacewatchLoUTNOs, centaur || 
|- id="2004 CO111" bgcolor=#fefefe
| 0 ||  || MBA-I || 17.9 || data-sort-value="0.78" | 780 m || multiple || 2004–2021 || 18 Jan 2021 || 103 || align=left | Disc.: Spacewatch || 
|- id="2004 CZ112" bgcolor=#FA8072
| 0 ||  || HUN || 18.98 || data-sort-value="0.48" | 480 m || multiple || 2004–2021 || 01 Nov 2021 || 68 || align=left | Disc.: LONEOS || 
|- id="2004 CO113" bgcolor=#d6d6d6
| 0 ||  || MBA-O || 15.80 || 3.9 km || multiple || 2004–2021 || 01 May 2021 || 247 || align=left | Disc.: LONEOSAlt.: 2010 KV143 || 
|- id="2004 CJ114" bgcolor=#E9E9E9
| 0 ||  || MBA-M || 16.9 || 1.8 km || multiple || 2004–2021 || 08 Jan 2021 || 172 || align=left | Disc.: LONEOSAlt.: 2016 YH7 || 
|- id="2004 CY116" bgcolor=#d6d6d6
| 0 ||  || MBA-O || 17.13 || 2.1 km || multiple || 2004–2021 || 08 May 2021 || 81 || align=left | Disc.: LPL/Spacewatch IIAlt.: 2008 XZ20 || 
|- id="2004 CH117" bgcolor=#d6d6d6
| 0 ||  || MBA-O || 16.95 || 2.3 km || multiple || 2002–2021 || 14 Apr 2021 || 97 || align=left | Disc.: Spacewatch || 
|- id="2004 CJ117" bgcolor=#E9E9E9
| 0 ||  || MBA-M || 17.80 || data-sort-value="0.82" | 820 m || multiple || 2004–2021 || 09 May 2021 || 38 || align=left | Disc.: LPL/Spacewatch IIAdded on 22 July 2020 || 
|- id="2004 CD118" bgcolor=#d6d6d6
| 0 ||  || MBA-O || 15.9 || 3.7 km || multiple || 1999–2019 || 24 Dec 2019 || 139 || align=left | Disc.: SDSSAlt.: 1999 FW93, 2016 DJ29 || 
|- id="2004 CX118" bgcolor=#fefefe
| 0 ||  || MBA-I || 18.34 || data-sort-value="0.64" | 640 m || multiple || 2004–2022 || 06 Jan 2022 || 37 || align=left | Disc.: LPL/Spacewatch II || 
|- id="2004 CD119" bgcolor=#E9E9E9
| 0 ||  || MBA-M || 17.87 || 1.1 km || multiple || 2004–2021 || 17 Apr 2021 || 62 || align=left | Disc.: LPL/Spacewatch II || 
|- id="2004 CN119" bgcolor=#d6d6d6
| 0 ||  || MBA-O || 16.74 || 2.5 km || multiple || 2004–2021 || 28 Oct 2021 || 100 || align=left | Disc.: Spacewatch || 
|- id="2004 CO119" bgcolor=#fefefe
| 0 ||  || MBA-I || 18.6 || data-sort-value="0.57" | 570 m || multiple || 2004–2020 || 15 Oct 2020 || 50 || align=left | Disc.: Spacewatch || 
|- id="2004 CT119" bgcolor=#fefefe
| 0 ||  || MBA-I || 18.44 || data-sort-value="0.61" | 610 m || multiple || 1999–2021 || 03 May 2021 || 435 || align=left | Disc.: SpacewatchAlt.: 2013 YA63, 2018 HQ4 || 
|- id="2004 CU119" bgcolor=#d6d6d6
| 0 ||  || MBA-O || 15.7 || 4.0 km || multiple || 2003–2021 || 18 Jan 2021 || 147 || align=left | Disc.: LPL/Spacewatch II || 
|- id="2004 CY119" bgcolor=#fefefe
| 0 ||  || MBA-I || 18.8 || data-sort-value="0.52" | 520 m || multiple || 2004–2019 || 22 Sep 2019 || 40 || align=left | Disc.: LPL/Spacewatch II || 
|- id="2004 CB120" bgcolor=#fefefe
| 0 ||  || MBA-I || 19.0 || data-sort-value="0.47" | 470 m || multiple || 2004–2021 || 09 Apr 2021 || 33 || align=left | Disc.: LPL/Spacewatch IIAdded on 17 June 2021Alt.: 2009 SA54 || 
|- id="2004 CT120" bgcolor=#d6d6d6
| 0 ||  || MBA-O || 16.9 || 2.3 km || multiple || 2004–2020 || 25 Feb 2020 || 130 || align=left | Disc.: SpacewatchAlt.: 2010 BX147 || 
|- id="2004 CU120" bgcolor=#E9E9E9
| 0 ||  || MBA-M || 17.7 || 1.6 km || multiple || 2004–2017 || 03 Jan 2017 || 26 || align=left | Disc.: LPL/Spacewatch II || 
|- id="2004 CV121" bgcolor=#d6d6d6
| 0 ||  || MBA-O || 17.27 || 2.0 km || multiple || 2004–2021 || 08 May 2021 || 48 || align=left | Disc.: Spacewatch || 
|- id="2004 CE122" bgcolor=#d6d6d6
| 0 ||  || MBA-O || 17.3 || 1.9 km || multiple || 2003–2020 || 12 Apr 2020 || 81 || align=left | Disc.: SpacewatchAlt.: 2008 XS41 || 
|- id="2004 CG122" bgcolor=#E9E9E9
| 0 ||  || MBA-M || 17.8 || 1.2 km || multiple || 2004–2021 || 19 Jan 2021 || 57 || align=left | Disc.: Spacewatch || 
|- id="2004 CJ122" bgcolor=#E9E9E9
| 0 ||  || MBA-M || 17.28 || 1.9 km || multiple || 2004–2021 || 05 Dec 2021 || 85 || align=left | Disc.: SpacewatchAdded on 22 July 2020 || 
|- id="2004 CV122" bgcolor=#E9E9E9
| 0 ||  || MBA-M || 17.83 || 1.5 km || multiple || 2004–2022 || 06 Jan 2022 || 54 || align=left | Disc.: Spacewatch || 
|- id="2004 CX122" bgcolor=#E9E9E9
| 0 ||  || MBA-M || 16.8 || 2.4 km || multiple || 2004–2021 || 05 Jan 2021 || 137 || align=left | Disc.: SpacewatchAlt.: 2006 SA293, 2013 AA98 || 
|- id="2004 CZ122" bgcolor=#d6d6d6
| 0 ||  || MBA-O || 16.23 || 3.2 km || multiple || 2001–2021 || 03 May 2021 || 126 || align=left | Disc.: Spacewatch || 
|- id="2004 CD123" bgcolor=#fefefe
| 3 ||  || MBA-I || 18.8 || data-sort-value="0.52" | 520 m || multiple || 2004–2018 || 13 Apr 2018 || 89 || align=left | Disc.: Spacewatch || 
|- id="2004 CQ123" bgcolor=#d6d6d6
| 0 ||  || MBA-O || 16.1 || 3.4 km || multiple || 2004–2021 || 06 Mar 2021 || 75 || align=left | Disc.: SpacewatchAdded on 11 May 2021Alt.: 2010 KX108 || 
|- id="2004 CW123" bgcolor=#fefefe
| 0 ||  || MBA-I || 18.6 || data-sort-value="0.57" | 570 m || multiple || 2004–2021 || 17 Jan 2021 || 66 || align=left | Disc.: SpacewatchAdded on 9 March 2021 || 
|- id="2004 CD124" bgcolor=#d6d6d6
| 0 ||  || MBA-O || 16.54 || 2.7 km || multiple || 2004–2021 || 31 Mar 2021 || 89 || align=left | Disc.: LPL/Spacewatch II || 
|- id="2004 CJ125" bgcolor=#E9E9E9
| 4 ||  || MBA-M || 18.2 || 1.3 km || multiple || 2004–2013 || 14 Mar 2013 || 16 || align=left | Disc.: SpacewatchAdded on 24 December 2021 || 
|- id="2004 CS125" bgcolor=#fefefe
| 0 ||  || MBA-I || 18.3 || data-sort-value="0.65" | 650 m || multiple || 1997–2020 || 08 Dec 2020 || 110 || align=left | Disc.: Spacewatch || 
|- id="2004 CF126" bgcolor=#E9E9E9
| 0 ||  || MBA-M || 17.51 || 1.3 km || multiple || 2004–2021 || 07 Apr 2021 || 166 || align=left | Disc.: Spacewatch || 
|- id="2004 CM126" bgcolor=#E9E9E9
| 0 ||  || MBA-M || 17.0 || 1.7 km || multiple || 2004–2021 || 12 Jan 2021 || 116 || align=left | Disc.: SpacewatchAlt.: 2015 RV233 || 
|- id="2004 CH127" bgcolor=#d6d6d6
| 0 ||  || MBA-O || 16.32 || 3.0 km || multiple || 1998–2021 || 03 May 2021 || 121 || align=left | Disc.: SpacewatchAlt.: 2010 LP25, 2012 QS48 || 
|- id="2004 CB128" bgcolor=#fefefe
| 0 ||  || MBA-I || 17.96 || data-sort-value="0.76" | 760 m || multiple || 1992–2021 || 03 May 2021 || 118 || align=left | Disc.: Spacewatch || 
|- id="2004 CG129" bgcolor=#E9E9E9
| 1 ||  || MBA-M || 18.05 || data-sort-value="0.73" | 730 m || multiple || 2004–2021 || 05 Jul 2021 || 50 || align=left | Disc.: SpacewatchAdded on 17 June 2021 || 
|- id="2004 CW130" bgcolor=#d6d6d6
| 0 ||  || MBA-O || 17.05 || 2.2 km || multiple || 2004–2021 || 17 Apr 2021 || 100 || align=left | Disc.: NEAT || 
|- id="2004 CB131" bgcolor=#E9E9E9
| 2 ||  || MBA-M || 18.6 || data-sort-value="0.57" | 570 m || multiple || 2004–2020 || 22 Jan 2020 || 35 || align=left | Disc.: Spacewatch || 
|- id="2004 CC131" bgcolor=#E9E9E9
| 0 ||  || MBA-M || 16.9 || 2.3 km || multiple || 2004–2021 || 06 Jan 2021 || 78 || align=left | Disc.: NEAT || 
|- id="2004 CD131" bgcolor=#d6d6d6
| 0 ||  || MBA-O || 16.48 || 2.8 km || multiple || 2004–2021 || 19 May 2021 || 160 || align=left | Disc.: Spacewatch || 
|- id="2004 CF131" bgcolor=#E9E9E9
| 0 ||  || MBA-M || 17.80 || data-sort-value="0.82" | 820 m || multiple || 2004–2021 || 08 May 2021 || 109 || align=left | Disc.: Spacewatch || 
|- id="2004 CK131" bgcolor=#fefefe
| 0 ||  || MBA-I || 18.2 || data-sort-value="0.68" | 680 m || multiple || 2004–2021 || 06 Jan 2021 || 96 || align=left | Disc.: LPL/Spacewatch II || 
|- id="2004 CM131" bgcolor=#E9E9E9
| 0 ||  || MBA-M || 17.1 || 1.1 km || multiple || 2004–2021 || 15 Jun 2021 || 188 || align=left | Disc.: Spacewatch || 
|- id="2004 CQ131" bgcolor=#E9E9E9
| 0 ||  || MBA-M || 16.77 || 2.5 km || multiple || 2004–2022 || 25 Jan 2022 || 108 || align=left | Disc.: SpacewatchAlt.: 2010 LU152 || 
|- id="2004 CR131" bgcolor=#fefefe
| 0 ||  || MBA-I || 17.9 || data-sort-value="0.78" | 780 m || multiple || 2004–2020 || 11 Dec 2020 || 72 || align=left | Disc.: LPL/Spacewatch II || 
|- id="2004 CS131" bgcolor=#fefefe
| 1 ||  || MBA-I || 18.4 || data-sort-value="0.62" | 620 m || multiple || 2004–2021 || 08 Jan 2021 || 81 || align=left | Disc.: Spacewatch || 
|- id="2004 CT131" bgcolor=#fefefe
| 0 ||  || MBA-I || 18.14 || data-sort-value="0.70" | 700 m || multiple || 2004–2021 || 30 Sep 2021 || 90 || align=left | Disc.: Spacewatch || 
|- id="2004 CU131" bgcolor=#fefefe
| 0 ||  || MBA-I || 18.31 || data-sort-value="0.65" | 650 m || multiple || 2004–2022 || 27 Jan 2022 || 89 || align=left | Disc.: Spacewatch || 
|- id="2004 CV131" bgcolor=#E9E9E9
| 0 ||  || MBA-M || 17.4 || 1.8 km || multiple || 2004–2020 || 23 Aug 2020 || 62 || align=left | Disc.: Spacewatch || 
|- id="2004 CW131" bgcolor=#E9E9E9
| 0 ||  || MBA-M || 17.8 || 1.2 km || multiple || 2004–2021 || 15 Jan 2021 || 70 || align=left | Disc.: Spacewatch || 
|- id="2004 CX131" bgcolor=#E9E9E9
| 0 ||  || MBA-M || 17.0 || 1.2 km || multiple || 2004–2019 || 20 Dec 2019 || 67 || align=left | Disc.: Spacewatch || 
|- id="2004 CY131" bgcolor=#d6d6d6
| 0 ||  || MBA-O || 16.2 || 3.2 km || multiple || 2004–2019 || 28 Dec 2019 || 77 || align=left | Disc.: Spacewatch || 
|- id="2004 CZ131" bgcolor=#E9E9E9
| 0 ||  || MBA-M || 17.43 || 1.4 km || multiple || 2004–2021 || 31 Mar 2021 || 97 || align=left | Disc.: Spacewatch || 
|- id="2004 CA132" bgcolor=#fefefe
| 0 ||  || MBA-I || 18.3 || data-sort-value="0.65" | 650 m || multiple || 1997–2020 || 13 Sep 2020 || 56 || align=left | Disc.: Spacewatch || 
|- id="2004 CB132" bgcolor=#fefefe
| 0 ||  || MBA-I || 18.17 || data-sort-value="0.69" | 690 m || multiple || 2004–2021 || 11 Nov 2021 || 51 || align=left | Disc.: Spacewatch || 
|- id="2004 CC132" bgcolor=#fefefe
| 0 ||  || MBA-I || 18.8 || data-sort-value="0.52" | 520 m || multiple || 2004–2020 || 13 Nov 2020 || 72 || align=left | Disc.: Spacewatch || 
|- id="2004 CD132" bgcolor=#fefefe
| 0 ||  || MBA-I || 18.0 || data-sort-value="0.75" | 750 m || multiple || 2004–2021 || 18 Jan 2021 || 72 || align=left | Disc.: Spacewatch || 
|- id="2004 CE132" bgcolor=#fefefe
| 0 ||  || MBA-I || 18.0 || data-sort-value="0.75" | 750 m || multiple || 2004–2019 || 05 Nov 2019 || 58 || align=left | Disc.: Spacewatch || 
|- id="2004 CF132" bgcolor=#E9E9E9
| 0 ||  || MBA-M || 17.35 || 1.0 km || multiple || 2004–2021 || 03 May 2021 || 121 || align=left | Disc.: Spacewatch || 
|- id="2004 CG132" bgcolor=#d6d6d6
| 0 ||  || MBA-O || 16.18 || 3.2 km || multiple || 2004–2021 || 13 Apr 2021 || 146 || align=left | Disc.: NEAT || 
|- id="2004 CH132" bgcolor=#E9E9E9
| 2 ||  || MBA-M || 18.3 || data-sort-value="0.65" | 650 m || multiple || 2004–2020 || 03 Feb 2020 || 72 || align=left | Disc.: LPL/Spacewatch IIAlt.: 2016 BK27 || 
|- id="2004 CK132" bgcolor=#fefefe
| 0 ||  || MBA-I || 18.6 || data-sort-value="0.57" | 570 m || multiple || 2004–2019 || 04 Sep 2019 || 64 || align=left | Disc.: Spacewatch || 
|- id="2004 CL132" bgcolor=#fefefe
| 3 ||  || MBA-I || 18.4 || data-sort-value="0.62" | 620 m || multiple || 2004–2018 || 18 Mar 2018 || 40 || align=left | Disc.: Spacewatch || 
|- id="2004 CM132" bgcolor=#fefefe
| 1 ||  || MBA-I || 18.8 || data-sort-value="0.52" | 520 m || multiple || 2004–2020 || 16 Aug 2020 || 49 || align=left | Disc.: Spacewatch || 
|- id="2004 CN132" bgcolor=#E9E9E9
| 0 ||  || MBA-M || 18.1 || 1.0 km || multiple || 2004–2021 || 18 Jan 2021 || 38 || align=left | Disc.: Spacewatch || 
|- id="2004 CO132" bgcolor=#E9E9E9
| 0 ||  || MBA-M || 18.10 || data-sort-value="0.71" | 710 m || multiple || 2004–2021 || 02 May 2021 || 75 || align=left | Disc.: Spacewatch || 
|- id="2004 CP132" bgcolor=#E9E9E9
| 0 ||  || MBA-M || 17.6 || data-sort-value="0.90" | 900 m || multiple || 1994–2020 || 26 Jan 2020 || 182 || align=left | Disc.: SpacewatchAlt.: 1994 RU2 || 
|- id="2004 CQ132" bgcolor=#fefefe
| 0 ||  || MBA-I || 18.30 || data-sort-value="0.65" | 650 m || multiple || 2004–2021 || 14 Sep 2021 || 57 || align=left | Disc.: Spacewatch || 
|- id="2004 CR132" bgcolor=#fefefe
| 0 ||  || MBA-I || 18.4 || data-sort-value="0.62" | 620 m || multiple || 2004–2020 || 11 Nov 2020 || 66 || align=left | Disc.: Spacewatch || 
|- id="2004 CS132" bgcolor=#d6d6d6
| 0 ||  || MBA-O || 16.84 || 2.4 km || multiple || 2004–2021 || 12 May 2021 || 95 || align=left | Disc.: LPL/Spacewatch II || 
|- id="2004 CT132" bgcolor=#fefefe
| 1 ||  || MBA-I || 17.6 || data-sort-value="0.90" | 900 m || multiple || 2004–2020 || 23 Dec 2020 || 53 || align=left | Disc.: Kitt Peak Obs. || 
|- id="2004 CU132" bgcolor=#fefefe
| 0 ||  || MBA-I || 18.3 || data-sort-value="0.65" | 650 m || multiple || 2004–2021 || 17 Jan 2021 || 56 || align=left | Disc.: NEAT || 
|- id="2004 CV132" bgcolor=#E9E9E9
| 0 ||  || MBA-M || 17.2 || 1.5 km || multiple || 2004–2021 || 08 Jan 2021 || 76 || align=left | Disc.: LPL/Spacewatch II || 
|- id="2004 CW132" bgcolor=#E9E9E9
| 0 ||  || MBA-M || 17.54 || 1.3 km || multiple || 2004–2021 || 14 Apr 2021 || 87 || align=left | Disc.: Spacewatch || 
|- id="2004 CX132" bgcolor=#d6d6d6
| 0 ||  || MBA-O || 16.6 || 2.7 km || multiple || 2004–2019 || 02 Dec 2019 || 48 || align=left | Disc.: Spacewatch || 
|- id="2004 CA133" bgcolor=#fefefe
| 0 ||  || MBA-I || 18.9 || data-sort-value="0.49" | 490 m || multiple || 2004–2020 || 13 Sep 2020 || 41 || align=left | Disc.: Spacewatch || 
|- id="2004 CB133" bgcolor=#E9E9E9
| 1 ||  || MBA-M || 17.8 || 1.2 km || multiple || 2004–2018 || 14 Jun 2018 || 36 || align=left | Disc.: Spacewatch || 
|- id="2004 CC133" bgcolor=#fefefe
| 1 ||  || MBA-I || 18.2 || data-sort-value="0.68" | 680 m || multiple || 2004–2015 || 17 Apr 2015 || 35 || align=left | Disc.: Spacewatch || 
|- id="2004 CD133" bgcolor=#d6d6d6
| 0 ||  || MBA-O || 16.71 || 2.5 km || multiple || 2004–2021 || 15 May 2021 || 93 || align=left | Disc.: SpacewatchAlt.: 2010 BX96, 2010 OF38 || 
|- id="2004 CE133" bgcolor=#E9E9E9
| 1 ||  || MBA-M || 17.9 || data-sort-value="0.78" | 780 m || multiple || 2004–2020 || 02 Feb 2020 || 58 || align=left | Disc.: LPL/Spacewatch IIAlt.: 2016 BN42 || 
|- id="2004 CG133" bgcolor=#E9E9E9
| 0 ||  || MBA-M || 17.2 || 2.0 km || multiple || 2004–2020 || 12 Sep 2020 || 38 || align=left | Disc.: Spacewatch || 
|- id="2004 CH133" bgcolor=#E9E9E9
| 0 ||  || MBA-M || 18.19 || data-sort-value="0.68" | 680 m || multiple || 2004–2021 || 09 May 2021 || 66 || align=left | Disc.: Spacewatch || 
|- id="2004 CJ133" bgcolor=#E9E9E9
| 0 ||  || MBA-M || 18.2 || 1.3 km || multiple || 2004–2020 || 17 Aug 2020 || 54 || align=left | Disc.: Spacewatch || 
|- id="2004 CK133" bgcolor=#fefefe
| 0 ||  || MBA-I || 18.1 || data-sort-value="0.71" | 710 m || multiple || 2004–2021 || 16 May 2021 || 70 || align=left | Disc.: Spacewatch || 
|- id="2004 CL133" bgcolor=#fefefe
| 1 ||  || MBA-I || 18.4 || data-sort-value="0.62" | 620 m || multiple || 2004–2020 || 25 Sep 2020 || 36 || align=left | Disc.: Spacewatch || 
|- id="2004 CM133" bgcolor=#E9E9E9
| 0 ||  || MBA-M || 16.8 || 1.8 km || multiple || 2004–2021 || 12 Jan 2021 || 73 || align=left | Disc.: Spacewatch || 
|- id="2004 CN133" bgcolor=#d6d6d6
| 0 ||  || MBA-O || 16.7 || 2.5 km || multiple || 2004–2020 || 17 May 2020 || 49 || align=left | Disc.: Spacewatch || 
|- id="2004 CO133" bgcolor=#d6d6d6
| 1 ||  || HIL || 15.96 || 3.6 km || multiple || 2004–2021 || 07 Jun 2021 || 77 || align=left | Disc.: LPL/Spacewatch II || 
|- id="2004 CP133" bgcolor=#fefefe
| 2 ||  || MBA-I || 18.7 || data-sort-value="0.54" | 540 m || multiple || 2004–2015 || 08 Jun 2015 || 23 || align=left | Disc.: LPL/Spacewatch II || 
|- id="2004 CQ133" bgcolor=#E9E9E9
| 2 ||  || MBA-M || 18.6 || data-sort-value="0.80" | 800 m || multiple || 2004–2020 || 14 Dec 2020 || 31 || align=left | Disc.: LPL/Spacewatch II || 
|- id="2004 CT133" bgcolor=#E9E9E9
| 0 ||  || MBA-M || 17.32 || 1.0 km || multiple || 2004–2021 || 17 Apr 2021 || 115 || align=left | Disc.: SpacewatchAlt.: 2010 JF181 || 
|- id="2004 CU133" bgcolor=#d6d6d6
| 0 ||  || MBA-O || 16.2 || 3.2 km || multiple || 2004–2021 || 18 Jan 2021 || 110 || align=left | Disc.: SpacewatchAlt.: 2010 KT26 || 
|- id="2004 CV133" bgcolor=#d6d6d6
| 0 ||  || MBA-O || 16.69 || 2.6 km || multiple || 2004–2021 || 12 May 2021 || 81 || align=left | Disc.: Spacewatch || 
|- id="2004 CW133" bgcolor=#fefefe
| 0 ||  || MBA-I || 17.9 || data-sort-value="0.78" | 780 m || multiple || 2004–2021 || 18 Jan 2021 || 75 || align=left | Disc.: Spacewatch || 
|- id="2004 CX133" bgcolor=#d6d6d6
| 0 ||  || MBA-O || 16.94 || 2.3 km || multiple || 2004–2021 || 31 Oct 2021 || 87 || align=left | Disc.: Spacewatch || 
|- id="2004 CY133" bgcolor=#d6d6d6
| 0 ||  || MBA-O || 16.45 || 2.9 km || multiple || 2004–2021 || 12 May 2021 || 117 || align=left | Disc.: Spacewatch || 
|- id="2004 CA134" bgcolor=#E9E9E9
| 0 ||  || MBA-M || 17.5 || 1.3 km || multiple || 2004–2021 || 18 Jan 2021 || 74 || align=left | Disc.: Spacewatch || 
|- id="2004 CB134" bgcolor=#fefefe
| 0 ||  || HUN || 18.5 || data-sort-value="0.59" | 590 m || multiple || 2004–2019 || 31 Dec 2019 || 64 || align=left | Disc.: Kitt Peak Obs. || 
|- id="2004 CD134" bgcolor=#d6d6d6
| 0 ||  || MBA-O || 16.4 || 2.9 km || multiple || 2004–2021 || 15 Jan 2021 || 70 || align=left | Disc.: Spacewatch || 
|- id="2004 CE134" bgcolor=#d6d6d6
| 0 ||  || MBA-O || 16.25 || 3.1 km || multiple || 2002–2021 || 12 May 2021 || 150 || align=left | Disc.: Spacewatch || 
|- id="2004 CF134" bgcolor=#E9E9E9
| 0 ||  || MBA-M || 18.2 || data-sort-value="0.96" | 960 m || multiple || 2004–2019 || 28 Nov 2019 || 47 || align=left | Disc.: LPL/Spacewatch II || 
|- id="2004 CH134" bgcolor=#fefefe
| 0 ||  || MBA-I || 18.77 || data-sort-value="0.52" | 520 m || multiple || 2004–2021 || 03 May 2021 || 73 || align=left | Disc.: Spacewatch || 
|- id="2004 CJ134" bgcolor=#E9E9E9
| 0 ||  || MBA-M || 17.84 || 1.5 km || multiple || 2004–2022 || 13 Jan 2022 || 51 || align=left | Disc.: Spacewatch || 
|- id="2004 CK134" bgcolor=#E9E9E9
| 0 ||  || MBA-M || 17.0 || 1.7 km || multiple || 2004–2019 || 25 Oct 2019 || 40 || align=left | Disc.: Spacewatch || 
|- id="2004 CL134" bgcolor=#d6d6d6
| 0 ||  || MBA-O || 16.8 || 2.4 km || multiple || 2004–2019 || 26 Jan 2019 || 43 || align=left | Disc.: Spacewatch || 
|- id="2004 CM134" bgcolor=#E9E9E9
| 0 ||  || MBA-M || 17.2 || 2.0 km || multiple || 2004–2020 || 15 Oct 2020 || 44 || align=left | Disc.: LPL/Spacewatch II || 
|- id="2004 CN134" bgcolor=#fefefe
| 0 ||  || MBA-I || 18.2 || data-sort-value="0.68" | 680 m || multiple || 2004–2020 || 16 Jun 2020 || 47 || align=left | Disc.: Spacewatch || 
|- id="2004 CO134" bgcolor=#fefefe
| 0 ||  || MBA-I || 18.25 || data-sort-value="0.67" | 670 m || multiple || 2004–2021 || 18 May 2021 || 82 || align=left | Disc.: NEAT || 
|- id="2004 CP134" bgcolor=#E9E9E9
| 2 ||  || MBA-M || 18.9 || data-sort-value="0.49" | 490 m || multiple || 2004–2019 || 28 Nov 2019 || 43 || align=left | Disc.: Spacewatch || 
|- id="2004 CQ134" bgcolor=#fefefe
| 0 ||  || MBA-I || 18.8 || data-sort-value="0.52" | 520 m || multiple || 2004–2020 || 16 Oct 2020 || 57 || align=left | Disc.: Spacewatch || 
|- id="2004 CR134" bgcolor=#E9E9E9
| 0 ||  || MBA-M || 17.88 || data-sort-value="0.79" | 790 m || multiple || 2004–2021 || 14 Apr 2021 || 58 || align=left | Disc.: Spacewatch || 
|- id="2004 CS134" bgcolor=#d6d6d6
| 0 ||  || MBA-O || 16.92 || 2.3 km || multiple || 2004–2021 || 08 Aug 2021 || 66 || align=left | Disc.: Spacewatch || 
|- id="2004 CT134" bgcolor=#E9E9E9
| 0 ||  || MBA-M || 18.54 || data-sort-value="0.58" | 580 m || multiple || 2004–2021 || 15 Apr 2021 || 43 || align=left | Disc.: Spacewatch || 
|- id="2004 CU134" bgcolor=#E9E9E9
| 0 ||  || MBA-M || 17.0 || 1.7 km || multiple || 2004–2021 || 06 Jan 2021 || 90 || align=left | Disc.: Spacewatch || 
|- id="2004 CV134" bgcolor=#fefefe
| 0 ||  || MBA-I || 18.6 || data-sort-value="0.57" | 570 m || multiple || 1997–2019 || 28 Aug 2019 || 56 || align=left | Disc.: Spacewatch || 
|- id="2004 CW134" bgcolor=#d6d6d6
| 0 ||  || MBA-O || 16.5 || 2.8 km || multiple || 2004–2020 || 15 Feb 2020 || 64 || align=left | Disc.: Spacewatch || 
|- id="2004 CX134" bgcolor=#fefefe
| 0 ||  || MBA-I || 17.98 || data-sort-value="0.75" | 750 m || multiple || 2004–2021 || 13 Sep 2021 || 70 || align=left | Disc.: Spacewatch || 
|- id="2004 CZ134" bgcolor=#E9E9E9
| 0 ||  || MBA-M || 17.44 || 1.4 km || multiple || 2004–2022 || 09 Jan 2022 || 45 || align=left | Disc.: Spacewatch || 
|- id="2004 CA135" bgcolor=#fefefe
| 0 ||  || MBA-I || 18.7 || data-sort-value="0.54" | 540 m || multiple || 2004–2019 || 07 May 2019 || 41 || align=left | Disc.: LPL/Spacewatch II || 
|- id="2004 CC135" bgcolor=#fefefe
| 0 ||  || MBA-I || 18.40 || data-sort-value="0.62" | 620 m || multiple || 2004–2021 || 30 Nov 2021 || 57 || align=left | Disc.: Spacewatch || 
|- id="2004 CD135" bgcolor=#d6d6d6
| 0 ||  || MBA-O || 17.71 || 1.6 km || multiple || 2004–2021 || 14 Nov 2021 || 59 || align=left | Disc.: Spacewatch || 
|- id="2004 CE135" bgcolor=#E9E9E9
| 0 ||  || MBA-M || 17.04 || 2.2 km || multiple || 2004–2022 || 27 Jan 2022 || 82 || align=left | Disc.: LPL/Spacewatch IIAlt.: 2010 HU110 || 
|- id="2004 CF135" bgcolor=#fefefe
| 0 ||  || MBA-I || 18.8 || data-sort-value="0.52" | 520 m || multiple || 2004–2019 || 28 May 2019 || 37 || align=left | Disc.: Spacewatch || 
|- id="2004 CG135" bgcolor=#fefefe
| 0 ||  || MBA-I || 18.79 || data-sort-value="0.52" | 520 m || multiple || 2004–2021 || 26 Oct 2021 || 37 || align=left | Disc.: Spacewatch || 
|- id="2004 CH135" bgcolor=#E9E9E9
| 0 ||  || MBA-M || 17.93 || 1.4 km || multiple || 2004–2022 || 07 Jan 2022 || 39 || align=left | Disc.: Spacewatch || 
|- id="2004 CJ135" bgcolor=#d6d6d6
| 0 ||  || MBA-O || 16.67 || 2.6 km || multiple || 2004–2021 || 07 Apr 2021 || 106 || align=left | Disc.: SpacewatchAlt.: 2010 LM9 || 
|- id="2004 CK135" bgcolor=#E9E9E9
| 0 ||  || MBA-M || 17.77 || data-sort-value="0.83" | 830 m || multiple || 2004–2021 || 14 Apr 2021 || 73 || align=left | Disc.: LPL/Spacewatch II || 
|- id="2004 CL135" bgcolor=#fefefe
| 0 ||  || MBA-I || 18.1 || data-sort-value="0.71" | 710 m || multiple || 2004–2021 || 15 Jan 2021 || 55 || align=left | Disc.: Spacewatch || 
|- id="2004 CN135" bgcolor=#d6d6d6
| 0 ||  || MBA-O || 16.99 || 2.2 km || multiple || 2004–2021 || 09 Aug 2021 || 54 || align=left | Disc.: NEAT || 
|- id="2004 CR135" bgcolor=#E9E9E9
| 0 ||  || MBA-M || 18.23 || data-sort-value="0.67" | 670 m || multiple || 2004–2021 || 30 May 2021 || 59 || align=left | Disc.: Spacewatch || 
|- id="2004 CS135" bgcolor=#fefefe
| 3 ||  || MBA-I || 18.9 || data-sort-value="0.49" | 490 m || multiple || 2004–2018 || 18 Mar 2018 || 26 || align=left | Disc.: Spacewatch || 
|- id="2004 CT135" bgcolor=#d6d6d6
| 0 ||  || MBA-O || 16.5 || 2.8 km || multiple || 2004–2021 || 18 Jan 2021 || 78 || align=left | Disc.: Spacewatch || 
|- id="2004 CU135" bgcolor=#E9E9E9
| 0 ||  || MBA-M || 17.6 || 1.3 km || multiple || 2004–2020 || 24 Dec 2020 || 60 || align=left | Disc.: LPL/Spacewatch II || 
|- id="2004 CV135" bgcolor=#E9E9E9
| 0 ||  || MBA-M || 17.7 || data-sort-value="0.86" | 860 m || multiple || 2004–2021 || 08 Apr 2021 || 87 || align=left | Disc.: NEATAlt.: 2014 OQ161, 2014 OC458 || 
|- id="2004 CX135" bgcolor=#E9E9E9
| 1 ||  || MBA-M || 18.2 || data-sort-value="0.68" | 680 m || multiple || 2004–2020 || 24 Jan 2020 || 54 || align=left | Disc.: Spacewatch || 
|- id="2004 CY135" bgcolor=#d6d6d6
| 0 ||  || MBA-O || 16.73 || 2.5 km || multiple || 2004–2021 || 17 Apr 2021 || 67 || align=left | Disc.: Spacewatch || 
|- id="2004 CZ135" bgcolor=#d6d6d6
| 0 ||  || MBA-O || 16.3 || 3.1 km || multiple || 2004–2021 || 18 Jan 2021 || 59 || align=left | Disc.: Spacewatch || 
|- id="2004 CA136" bgcolor=#E9E9E9
| 0 ||  || MBA-M || 18.11 || data-sort-value="0.71" | 710 m || multiple || 2004–2021 || 15 Apr 2021 || 53 || align=left | Disc.: LPL/Spacewatch IIAlt.: 2010 LP53 || 
|- id="2004 CB136" bgcolor=#fefefe
| 1 ||  || MBA-I || 18.9 || data-sort-value="0.49" | 490 m || multiple || 2004–2017 || 26 Dec 2017 || 35 || align=left | Disc.: Spacewatch || 
|- id="2004 CC136" bgcolor=#E9E9E9
| 0 ||  || MBA-M || 18.4 || data-sort-value="0.62" | 620 m || multiple || 2004–2020 || 23 Jan 2020 || 36 || align=left | Disc.: LPL/Spacewatch IIAdded on 22 July 2020 || 
|- id="2004 CD136" bgcolor=#fefefe
| 0 ||  || MBA-I || 18.67 || data-sort-value="0.55" | 550 m || multiple || 2004–2021 || 16 Oct 2021 || 41 || align=left | Disc.: LPL/Spacewatch IIAdded on 22 July 2020 || 
|- id="2004 CE136" bgcolor=#d6d6d6
| 0 ||  || MBA-O || 17.41 || 1.8 km || multiple || 2004–2021 || 02 Jun 2021 || 57 || align=left | Disc.: SpacewatchAdded on 19 October 2020 || 
|- id="2004 CF136" bgcolor=#fefefe
| 1 ||  || MBA-I || 18.6 || data-sort-value="0.57" | 570 m || multiple || 2004–2019 || 24 Oct 2019 || 24 || align=left | Disc.: LPL/Spacewatch IIAdded on 17 January 2021 || 
|- id="2004 CG136" bgcolor=#fefefe
| 0 ||  || MBA-I || 18.4 || data-sort-value="0.62" | 620 m || multiple || 2002–2021 || 07 Jan 2021 || 48 || align=left | Disc.: SpacewatchAdded on 9 March 2021 || 
|}
back to top

References 
 

Lists of unnumbered minor planets